British singer Alexandra Burke has recorded songs for two studio albums. She has collaborated with other artists for duets and featured songs on her albums. Burke has also contributed vocals for charity singles. After she won the fifth series of The X Factor in December 2008, Burke signed a  recording contract with Syco Music. Her first single, "Hallelujah", was made available to purchase the day after she won the singing competition on 14 December 2008.

She began to work with writers for her debut album, Overcome, which was released on 19 October 2009. The album's second single, "Bad Boys" featuring Flo Rida, was released in the same month to coincide with Overcome. American singer-songwriter Ne-Yo co-wrote two songs for the album, "Good Night Good Morning" and "Nothing But the Girl"; he appeared as a featured artist on the former. "Good Night Good Morning" was written in collaboration with Norwegian production team Stargate, while "Nothing But the Girl" was co-written with Stargate along with Chase and Status. British singer-songwriter Pixie Lott received writing credits for the song "You Broke My Heart", while Moroccan-Swedish songwriter RedOne wrote and produced three songs for the album, "The Silence", "Broken Heels" and "Dumb". The re-release of Overcome in December 2010 included new songs which were not on the original album. They included collaborations with Cobra Starship on "What Happens on the Dancefloor" and Laza Morgan on "Start Without You". Burke stated that a newly recorded vocal version of "The Silence" was released as a promotional single for the album.

Burke revealed that she would be "getting down and dirty" on her second studio album, Heartbreak on Hold (2012), and that her future music would be "fiercer and sexier". She was involved with writing two songs on the album; "What Money Can't Buy" and the lead single "Elephant" featuring DJ Erick Morillo. Burke collaborated with a new set of writers and producers, none of whom were involved with Overcome. Autumn Rowe co-wrote the song "Fire", which was produced by iSHi. Cutfather and Jason Gill co-wrote and produced three songs for Heartbreak on Hold, "This Love Will Survive", "Between the Sheets" and the second single "Let It Go". DJ Smash and DJ Antoine collaborated for song "Tonight", while English DJ Michael Woods co-wrote and produced "Daylight Robbery". The deluxe edition of the album featured two additional songs, "Devil in Me" and "Beating Still"; Burke also recorded different vocals for acoustic versions of "Heartbreak on Hold" and "Let It Go".

In October 2012, Burke confirmed that she is in the process of recording songs for her third studio album, as well as an R&B album for her American debut, both due for release in 2013. In December 2012, Burke released her first Extended play (EP) entitled Christmas Gift. It contains two songs: a cover of "Silent Night" and an original track written by Burke entitled "Christmas Time".

Songs

References

Alexandra Burke songs
Lists of songs recorded by British artists